Jesse M. Bragg (February 5, 1887 – after 1922) was an American baseball third baseman in the Negro leagues. He played from 1908 to 1918, mostly with the Brooklyn Royal Giants, then reappeared in 1922 with the McConnell Colored Giants.

References

External links
  and Seamheads

Brooklyn Royal Giants players
Lincoln Giants players
Cuban X-Giants players
Schenectady Mohawk Giants players
1887 births
Year of death missing
Baseball players from Virginia
People from Amelia County, Virginia
Baseball infielders